Djurgården will in the 2010 season compete in the Allsvenskan and Svenska Cupen.
Tommy Jacobson was selected as new chairman and Lennart Wass became new manager and would work together with the manager from 2009, Andreé Jeglertz, but Jeglertz chose to left the club. Carlos Banda was contracted to work with Wass.

Squad 
 According to dif.se
 updated October 5, 2010

Transfers

Players in

Players out

Squad stats 
Last updated on 7 November 2010.

|}

Club

Coaching staff

Kit 

|
|
|}

Other information

Matches

Pre-season

Top scorers pre-season

Summer friendlies 
Friendly games because of Allsvenskan time-out during 2010 FIFA World Cup.

Top scorers summer

Allsvenskan

Results summary

Results by round

Standings

Top scorers Allsvenskan 

* Häcken will use Borås Arena as stadium for the season premiere because of weather conditions.

** Will be played without any supporters at the stadium, because of some incidents during the match against Assyriska in last years relegation match for Allsvenskan.

*** Played at Råsunda.

Svenska Cupen 

Swedish football clubs 2010 season
2010